Adela collicolella is a moth of the  family Adelidae. It is found in Spain and Portugal, as well as North Africa, including Morocco.

The wingspan is 11–12.5 mm for males and 13–14.5 mm for females. The forewings are shiny bronzy metallic, with a golden sheen. The costa is tinged with purple throughout. The hindwings are rich purple.

References

Moths described in 1904
Adelidae
Taxa named by Thomas de Grey, 6th Baron Walsingham